Minginui is a town in Whakatāne District and Bay of Plenty Region on New Zealand's North Island.

The Whirinaki Te Pua-a-Tāne Conservation Park is located near the town.

In 1978, there was confrontation between the local community and conservationists over native forest logging in the park, then known as Whirinaki State Forest. Four bus loads of conservationists arrived in Minginui from an ECO conference being held in Taupo. The local residents barricaded the road leading to the forest preventing a planned bush walk.

The 2006 New Zealand census recorded the population for the area as 1464, a reduction of 300 from 1996.

References

External links
Minginui Village - Information site

Whakatane District
Populated places in the Bay of Plenty Region